Skyler Milne (born September 27, 1993) is an American soccer player.

Career

College
Milne played college soccer at the Utah Valley University for three seasons between 2014 and 2016. While at college, Milne joined USL PDL side GPS Portland Phoenix during their 2016 season.

Professional
Milne signed with United Soccer League side Real Monarchs on March 13, 2017. He made his professional debut when he appeared on March 25, 2017 as an 89th-minute substitute during a 2-1 win over Portland Timbers 2. Milne was released by Real Monarchs at the end of the 2017 season.

References

External links
 

1993 births
Living people
American soccer players
Association football forwards
GPS Portland Phoenix players
Real Monarchs players
Soccer players from Utah
People from Logan, Utah
USL League Two players
USL Championship players
Utah Valley Wolverines men's soccer players